In computer programming, an anamorphism is a function that generates a sequence by repeated application of the function to its previous result. You begin with some value A and apply a function f to it to get B. Then you apply f to B to get C, and so on until some terminating condition is reached. The anamorphism is the function that generates the list of A, B, C, etc. You can think of the anamorphism as unfolding the initial value into a sequence.

The above layman's description can be stated more formally in category theory: the anamorphism of a coinductive type denotes the assignment of a coalgebra to its unique morphism to the final coalgebra of an endofunctor. These objects are used in functional programming as unfolds.

The categorical dual (aka opposite) of the anamorphism is the catamorphism.

Anamorphisms in functional programming 

In functional programming, an anamorphism is a generalization of the concept of unfolds on coinductive lists. Formally, anamorphisms are generic functions that can corecursively construct a result of a certain type and which is parameterized by functions that determine the next single step of the construction.

The data type in question is defined as the greatest fixed point ν X . F X of a functor F. By the universal property of final coalgebras, there is a unique coalgebra morphism A → ν X . F X for any other F-coalgebra a : A → F A. Thus, one can define functions from a type A _into_ a coinductive datatype by specifying a coalgebra structure a on A.

Example: Potentially infinite lists 

As an example, the type of potentially infinite lists (with elements of a fixed type value) is given as the fixed point [value] = ν X . value × X + 1, i.e. a list consists either of a value and a further list, or it is empty. A (pseudo-)Haskell-Definition might look like this:

data [value] = (value:[value]) | []

It is the fixed point of the functor F value, where:

data Maybe a = Just a | Nothing
data F value x = Maybe (value, x)

One can easily check that indeed the type [value] is isomorphic to  F value [value], and thus [value] is the fixed point.
(Also note that in Haskell, least and greatest fixed points of functors coincide, therefore inductive lists are the same as coinductive, potentially infinite lists.)

The anamorphism for lists (then usually known as unfold) would build a (potentially infinite) list from a state value. Typically, the unfold takes a state value x and a function f that yields either a pair of a value and a new state, or a singleton to mark the end of the list. The anamorphism would then begin with a first seed, compute whether the list continues or ends, and in case of a nonempty list, prepend the computed value to the recursive call to the anamorphism.

A Haskell definition of an unfold, or anamorphism for lists, called ana, is as follows:

ana :: (state -> Maybe (value, state)) -> state -> [value]
ana f stateOld = case f stateOld of
            Nothing                -> []
            Just (value, stateNew) -> value : ana f stateNew

We can now implement quite general functions using ana, for example a countdown:
f :: Int -> Maybe (Int, Int)
f current = let oneSmaller = current - 1
            in   if oneSmaller < 0
                   then Nothing
                   else Just (oneSmaller, oneSmaller)
This function will decrement an integer and output it at the same time, until it is negative, at which point it will mark the end of the list. Correspondingly, ana f 3 will compute the list [2,1,0].

Anamorphisms on other data structures 

An anamorphism can be defined for any recursive type, according to a generic pattern, generalizing the second version of ana for lists.

For example, the unfold for the tree data structure

 data Tree a = Leaf a | Branch (Tree a) a (Tree a)

is as follows
 ana :: (b -> Either a (b, a, b)) -> b -> Tree a
 ana unspool x = case unspool x of
                   Left a          -> Leaf a
                   Right (l, x, r) -> Branch (ana unspool l) x (ana unspool r)

To better see the relationship between the recursive type and its anamorphism, note that Tree and List can be defined thus:

 newtype List a = List {unCons :: Maybe (a, List a)}

 newtype Tree a = Tree {unNode :: Either a (Tree a, a, Tree a))}

The analogy with ana appears by renaming b in its type:

 newtype List a = List {unCons :: Maybe (a, List a)}
 anaList ::       (list_a       -> Maybe (a, list_a)) -> (list_a -> List a)

 newtype Tree a = Tree {unNode :: Either a (Tree a, a, Tree a))}
 anaTree ::       (tree_a       -> Either a (tree_a, a, tree_a)) -> (tree_a -> Tree a)

With these definitions, the argument to the constructor of the type has the same type as the return type of the first argument of ana, with the recursive mentions of the type replaced with b.

History 

One of the first publications to introduce the notion of an anamorphism in the context of programming was the paper Functional Programming with Bananas, Lenses, Envelopes and Barbed Wire, by Erik Meijer et al., which was in the context of the Squiggol programming language.

Applications
Functions like zip and iterate are examples of anamorphisms.  zip takes a pair of lists, say ['a','b','c'] and [1,2,3] and returns a list of pairs [('a',1),('b',2),('c',3)]. Iterate takes a thing, x, and a function, f, from such things to such things, and returns the infinite list that comes from repeated application of f, i.e. the list [x, (f x), (f (f x)), (f (f (f x))), ...].

 zip (a:as) (b:bs) = if (as==[]) || (bs ==[])   -- || means 'or'
                      then [(a,b)]
                      else (a,b):(zip as bs) 
 
 iterate f x = x:(iterate f (f x))

To prove this, we can implement both using our generic unfold, ana, using a simple recursive routine:
 zip2 = ana unsp fin
    where
    fin (as,bs) = (as==[]) || (bs ==[]) 
    unsp ((a:as), (b:bs)) = ((a,b),(as,bs))

 iterate2 f = ana (\a->(a,f a)) (\x->False) 
In a language like Haskell, even the abstract functions fold, unfold and ana are merely defined terms, as we have seen from the definitions given above.

Anamorphisms in category theory 

In category theory, anamorphisms are the categorical dual of catamorphisms (and catamorphisms are the categorical dual of anamorphisms).

That means the following. 
Suppose (A, fin) is a final F-coalgebra for some endofunctor F of some category into itself.
Thus, fin is a morphism from A to FA, and since it is assumed to be final we know that whenever (X, f) is another F-coalgebra (a morphism f from X to FX), there will be a unique homomorphism h from (X, f) to (A, fin), that is a morphism h from X to A such that fin . h = Fh . f.
Then for each such f we denote by ana f that uniquely specified morphism h.

In other words, we have the following defining relationship, given some fixed F, A, and fin as above:

Notation 

The brackets used are known as lens brackets, after which anamorphisms are sometimes referred to as lenses.

See also 
 Morphism
 Morphisms of F-algebras
 From an initial algebra to an algebra: Catamorphism
 An anamorphism followed by an catamorphism: Hylomorphism
 Extension of the idea of catamorphisms: Paramorphism
 Extension of the idea of anamorphisms: Apomorphism

References

External links 
 Anamorphisms in Haskell

Category theory
Recursion schemes